Fulvarba is a monotypic moth genus of the family Noctuidae erected by Emilio Berio in 1950. Its only species, Fulvarba fulvescens, was first described by George Hampson in 1910. It is found in South Africa.

References

Endemic moths of South Africa
Acontiinae
Monotypic moth genera